The Theban Tomb TT42 is located in Sheikh Abd el-Qurna, part of the Theban Necropolis, on the west bank of the Nile, opposite to Luxor. It is the burial place of the ancient Egyptian Amenmose, who title was Captain of Troops, Eye of the King in Retenu, he is buried alongside his wife, Henuttaui.

Tomb
The tomb decorations include the taking of a town in Syria and a northern tribute with Amenmose offering to king Tuthmosis III. It is possible that tribute scene is related to Amenmose's position as Overseer of the Northern Countries. The tribute recorded in Amenmose's tomb is unique in that it took place during a military campaign. The tribute is said to have taken place in the land of Negau, which was located in modern-day Lebanon. The fortress is shown as being located within a dense pine forest. In several scenes men are shown bringing vases, minerals, armament, horses, chariots and bulls. In one of the registers women are shown leading children by the hand. Amenmose also named Amenhotep II in his tomb indicating that he lived into the reign of Tuthmosis III's son and successor.

See also
 List of Theban tombs
 N. de Garis Davies, Nina and Norman de Garis Davies, Egyptologists

References

External links
 Scans of Norman and Nina De Garis Davies' tracings from Theban Tomb 42 (external).

Theban tombs
Nineteenth Dynasty of Egypt